Académica Petróleos do Lobito, usually known as Académica Lobito, are a football (soccer) club from Lobito, Angola. The club was founded in 1970 as Académica da Chilimba by Mr. Geraldo Guiado and a few associates. In 1981, a sponsoring deal with Angolan state-owned oil company Sonangol resulted in the club's name to be changed to the current designation.

They are competing in 2009 in the Girabola. They play their home games at Estádio do Buraco.

Achievements
Angolan 2nd Division: 1
2014

Recent seasons
Académica do Lobito's season-by-season performance since 2011:

League & cup positions

Players and staff

Players

Staff

Manager history

See also
 Girabola (2016)
 Gira Angola

References

External links
 Girabola.com profile
 Zerozero.pt profile
 Facebook profile

Football clubs in Angola
Sports clubs in Angola
Association football clubs established in 1974
1974 establishments in Angola